Gary Dennis McCord (born May 23, 1948) is an American professional golfer, commentator and author.

Early life and career
McCord was born in San Gabriel, California, and raised in southern California, graduating from Ramona High School in Riverside. He was a two-time Division II All-American for the UC Riverside Highlanders of the University of California, Riverside. He won the NCAA Division II individual championship in 1970 and turned professional in 1971.

McCord played in over 400 PGA Tour events but never won. His best two finishes on the PGA Tour were at the Greater Milwaukee Open, placing second in both 1975 and 1977. During his years on tour, he had two dozen top-10 finishes.

One year in his career won the PGA Tour category of "Fewest Putts." He helped reach this benchmark by, late in the season, deliberately missing the green and then chipping close to ensure few putts.

McCord was involved in an embarrassing episode during the 1984 FedEx St. Jude Classic in Memphis. When lining up a putt on the 15th green, McCord's pants split open, exposing his backside as he was not wearing any underwear. McCord wrapped a towel around his midriff and went off to find a replacement pair of pants. Eventually Peter Jacobsen offered McCord his rain pants for a "fee" of $20.

Broadcasting and writing career
At age 37 in 1986, McCord joined CBS Sports as a golf analyst. He was noted for his outspokenness and irreverence, traits that got him banished from the CBS commentary team for the Masters Tournament.

During the network's Masters coverage in 1994, McCord remarked that the 17th green was so fast it seemed to be "bikini-waxed", and that "body bags" were located behind the green for players who missed their approach shots. Several months later, Augusta National Golf Club used its influence with CBS to have him removed from the Masters commentary team.  While McCord continued to cover every other golf event aired by CBS, he did not return to Augusta with the network. He was not the first CBS commentator to be banned: Jack Whitaker referred to the gallery at the end of the 18-hole playoff in 1966 as a "mob" rather than "patrons" and was banned for the next five Masters; he was allowed to return in 1972.

After 33 years, McCord was not brought back for CBS’s 2020 golf broadcast team.

McCord also plays a limited schedule on the Champions Tour. After turning 50 in May 1998, he won his first title at the Toshiba Senior Classic in March 1999, and also won that year's Ingersoll-Rand Senior Tour Championship. Back in 1991, he won the Gateway Open on the Ben Hogan Tour, the second-tier golf tour in the U.S., now called the Korn Ferry Tour.

McCord has also written two books, Just a Range Ball in a Box of Titleists and Golf for Dummies. In 1996, he appeared as himself in the Kevin Costner movie Tin Cup, a movie he says is based on his life. He and fellow former CBS commentator Peter Kostis are partners in the Kostis/McCord Learning Center in Scottsdale, Arizona. McCord formerly served as a co-announcer on the EA Sports' Tiger Woods PGA Tour series along with David Feherty.

Personal life
McCord lives with his wife, Diane, in Paradise Valley, Arizona, and Edwards, Colorado.

Amateur wins
1970 NCAA Division II Championship

Professional wins (3)

Ben Hogan Tour wins (1)

Senior PGA Tour wins (2)

Senior PGA Tour playoff record (1–2)

Results in major championships

Note: McCord only played in the PGA Championship.

CUT = missed the half-way cut
"T" = tied

U.S. national team appearances
Professional
Wendy's 3-Tour Challenge (representing Senior PGA Tour): 2002

See also
1973 PGA Tour Qualifying School graduates
1982 PGA Tour Qualifying School graduates

References

External links
Gary McCord's Homepage

Grayhawk Learning Center (formerly Kostis~McCord Learning Center)

American male golfers
PGA Tour golfers
PGA Tour Champions golfers
Golf writers and broadcasters
Golfers from California
Golfers from Arizona
Golfers from Colorado
University of California, Riverside alumni
People from San Gabriel, California
Sportspeople from Los Angeles County, California
People from Paradise Valley, Arizona
Sportspeople from the Phoenix metropolitan area
People from Eagle County, Colorado
1948 births
Living people